Sagi Lakshmi Venkatapathy Raju, sometimes spelt Venkapathy Raju (born 9 July 1969) is a former Indian cricketer , cricket administrators & cricket coach. He came into the Indian side in 1989–90 after capturing 32 wickets in the domestic season. He made his Test and One Day International début in the tour of New Zealand. When sent in as a night-watchman in his first Test innings, he batted for more than two hours for 31 runs while six wickets fell at the other end. He was part of the Indian team in England in 1990, but the knuckle of his left hand was broken by Courtney Walsh in the match against Gloucestershire which ended his tour.

Back home in India, he helped India win the one-off Test against Sri Lanka in the only Test match played at the Sector 16 Stadium in Chandigarh. Raju was a last-minute selection on a wicket that afforded turn and kept low. On the second day, he ran through the Lankan middle order with a spell of 5 wickets for two runs in 39 balls. He took one more wicket on the next day to finish with 6 for 12 in 17.5 overs, four of the batsmen failed to score. His match figures of 8 for 37 in 53 overs won him the only man of the match award of his international career. He has played two World Cups for India in 1992 and 1996.

He last played a Test match against Australia in Calcutta, where he captured the wicket of Mark Waugh.

He continued playing for Hyderabad for many years, making the final of the 1999–2000 Ranji Trophy. He retired from first-class cricket in December 2004, after a domestic match against Uttar Pradesh.

Early life
Venkatapathy Raju grew up in Hyderabad and attended The Hyderabad Public School, Ramanthapur in Hyderabad.

Raju is married to uma maheshwari.

Present role 
Raju was the vice president of Hyderabad Cricket Association. Earlier, he was the selector for Indian Cricket Team from the south zone during 2007-2008, when India won the ICC World T20 under Dhoni's captaincy. Currently working as a commentator for Hotstar Telugu premium channel for CWC2019.

Role model status
Left-arm orthodox spinner Pragyan Ojha claimed in an interview that it was Raju that inspired him to play for India.

Very surprising decision of not picking him in 1996 World Cup Semi Final cost India heavily as they could not make using of spin track of Eden Gardens, Kolkata & lost heavily. Later in Singapore Raju picked 3 wickets against SL and won the match for India.

References

External links
Interview of Venkatapathy Raju in CricketFundas.com
Muscles of Might
Interview of Venkatapathy Raju in Telangana Today

1969 births
Living people
India One Day International cricketers
Raji, Venkatapath
Indian cricketers
Hyderabad cricketers
South Zone cricketers
People from East Godavari district
Telugu people
Raji, Venkatapath
Indian cricket coaches
Cricketers from Andhra Pradesh
Coaches of the United States national cricket team
Coaches of the Nepal national cricket team
Cricketers at the 1992 Cricket World Cup
Cricketers at the 1996 Cricket World Cup
Alumni of All Saints High School, Hyderabad